Ebenopsis is a genus of flowering plants in the family Fabaceae. The name is derived from the Greek words ἔβενος (ébenos), meaning ebony, and ὄψις (opsis), meaning "view."

Species
 Ebenopsis confinis  (Standl.) Britton & Rose
 Ebenopsis ebano  (Berland.) Barneby & J.W.Grimes - Texas ebony (Southern Texas in the United States, eastern Mexico)

References

Mimosoids
Fabaceae genera